This is a list of the heads of state of Tuvalu, from the independence of Tuvalu in 1978 to the present day.

The Monarchy of Tuvalu exists in a framework of a parliamentary representative democracy. As a constitutional monarch,  the Queen of Tuvalu, Elizabeth II, acts entirely on the advice of her government ministers in Tuvalu. The Head of State is recognised in section 50 of the Constitution of Tuvalu, as a symbol of the unity and identity of Tuvalu. The powers of the head of state are set out in section 52 (1) of the Constitution.

Part IV of the Constitution confirms the head of state of Tuvalu is Queen Elizabeth II as the sovereign of Tuvalu and provides for the rules for succession to the Crown.  As set out in section 54 of the Constitution, the Queen’s representative in Tuvalu by a Governor-General. Section 58 of the Constitution requires the governor-general to perform the functions of the head of state when the sovereign is outside Tuvalu or otherwise incapacitated. The Governor-General of Tuvalu is appointed by the monarch upon the advice of the Prime Minister of Tuvalu.

The position is largely ceremonial. However the holder has constitutional responsibilities and reserve powers in relation to the ordering parliament to convene and the appointment and dismissal of the prime minister. In 2003 the Chief Justice of the High Court of Tuvalu delivered directions as to how the Governor-General should proceed to take any action he considers to be appropriate under Section 116(1) of the Constitution, acting in his own deliberate judgment, rather than as advised by the cabinet. That is, the Governor-General could consider whether it was appropriate to exercise his reserve powers in calling parliament.

Monarch (1978–present)
The monarch of the United Kingdom has been the Queen of Tuvalu since Tuvaluan independence in 1978. The line of succession to the Tuvaluan throne is the same as that of the thrones of other Commonwealth realms.

Governor-General
The Governor-General is the representative of the Monarch in Tuvalu and exercises most of the powers of the Monarch. The Governor-General is appointed for an indefinite term, serving at the pleasure of the Monarch. The Governor-General is appointed solely on the advice of the Cabinet of Tuvalu without the involvement of the British government. In the event of a vacancy the Speaker serves as Officer Administering the Government.

Following is a list of people who have served as Governor-General of Tuvalu since independence in 1978.

Standards

External links
 Rulers.org – Tuvalu

References

Government of Tuvalu
Heads of state
Tuvalu